Alpington is a village and civil parish in the English county of Norfolk. It is situated about six miles (10 km) south-east of Norwich and is closely associated with Yelverton just to the north.

There is some confusion over Alpington's entries in the Domesday Book. Two entries call the village 'Appletuna' or 'Appletona', Old English for 'apple tree farm'. However, two further entries use the names 'Algamundestuna' and 'Alcmuntona', Old English for 'Ahlmund's enclosure'. These may relate to Alpington or to an unknown settlement close by.

Ekwall suggests that it is "not impossible" that Apton, formerly part of the adjacent parish of Bergh Apton, is a reduced form of Appleton. So Apton may be linked to Alpington.

The civil parish has an area of 2.18 square kilometres and in the 2001 census had a population of 460 in 199 households, increasing to 477 at the 2011 Census. For the purposes of local government, the parish falls within the district of South Norfolk.

The village has a village hall, primary school and a pub, the 'Wheel of Fortune'.

Alpington and Yelverton are served by Ambassador Travel buses to Norwich and out to Seething and Loddon.

Notable residents
 British tennis-player Richard Bloomfield is from Alpington.

War Memorial

St. Mary's Church holds the memorial for commemorating the dead from Alpington and Yelverton. It holds the following names from the First World War:

 Lieutenant Leonard J. Harrison (1895-1915), 2nd Battalion, Lancashire Fusiliers
 Corporal Harry J. Jordan (1884-1916), 1st Battalion, Royal Norfolk Regiment
 Lance-Corporal Harry N. Weeding (1882-1916), 8th Battalion, Royal Norfolk Regiment
 Lance-Corporal William Aldis (1892-1916), 9th Battalion, Royal Norfolk Regiment
 Sapper George E. Smith (1891-1918), 2nd Field Company, Royal Engineers
 Trooper Edward W. Davey (1882-1916), 6th (Inniskilling) Dragoons
 Private James P. Clare (1882-1915), 1st Battalion, Essex Regiment
 Private Ernest W. Smith (1880-1917), 5th Battalion, Essex Regiment
 Private Charles Boggis (1897-1916), 23rd Battalion, Middlesex Regiment
 Private Herbert V. Aldis (1894-1916), 9th Battalion, Royal Norfolk Regiment
 Private Arthur W. Goodchild (1898-1918), 9th Battalion, Royal Norfolk Regiment
 Private George J. Goodchild (1892-1918), 9th Battalion, Royal Norfolk Regiment
 Private Walter E. Burton (1896-1917), 4th Battalion, Oxfordshire and Buckinghamshire Light Infantry
 Sub-Lieutenant Gerald Y. Harrison (1897-1917), HMS Vanguard (1909)
 Ordinary Seaman Leonard W. Ellis (1900-1918), Royal Naval Reserve

Notes

External links
 Community website for Alpington and Yelverton 
 
 Alpington on GENUKI.
 
 http://kepn.nottingham.ac.uk/map/place/Norfolk/Alpington

Villages in Norfolk
Civil parishes in Norfolk